Crying is the human production of tears in response to an emotional state.

Crying may also refer to:

Music 
 Crying (band), an American rock band from Purchase, New York
 Crying (album), a 1962 album by Roy Orbison

Songs 
 "Cryin'", a 1993 song by Aerosmith
 "Cryin'" (Joe Satriani song), 1992
 "Crying" (Roy Orbison song), 1961
 "Cryin'" (Vixen song), 1988
 "Crying", by Björk from Debut
 "Crying", by Bobby Vinton from Roses Are Red
 "Cryin'", by Chris Isaak from Chris Isaak
 "Cryin'", by Doro from Angels Never Die
 "Cryin'", by Eric Clapton from Crossroads 2: Live in the Seventies
 "Crying", by George Harrison from Wonderwall Music
 "Crying", by King Gizzard & the Lizard Wizard from Oddments
 "Crying", by J. J. Cale from Okie
 "Cryin'", by Ringo Starr from Ringo's Rotogravure
 "Crying", by Sistar from Give It To Me
 "Crying", by TV on the Radio from Dear Science
 "Crying", by Yngwie Malmsteen from Trilogy

Other uses
 "Crying" (Beavis and Butt-Head), an episode of Beavis and Butt-Head

See also 
 
 
 Cry (disambiguation)
 Animal communication
 Town crier